The 1974 Houston Astros season was a season in American baseball. The team finished fourth in the National League West with a record of 81–81, 21 games behind the Los Angeles Dodgers.

Offseason 
 March 30, 1974: Larry Yount and Don Stratton (minors) were traded by the Astros to the Milwaukee Brewers for Wilbur Howard.

Regular season

Standings

Record vs. opponents

Notable transactions 
 June 5, 1974: Alan Knicely was drafted by the Astros in the 3rd round of the 1974 Major League Baseball draft.
 June 17, 1974: Oscar Zamora was purchased from the Astros by the Chicago Cubs.
 August 15, 1974: Claude Osteen was traded by the Astros to the St. Louis Cardinals for Ron Selak (minors) and a player to be named later. The Cardinals completed the trade by sending Dan Larson to the Astros on October 14.

Roster

Player stats

Batting

Starters by position 
Note: Pos = Position; G = Games played; AB = At bats; H = Hits; Avg. = Batting average; HR = Home runs; RBI = Runs batted in

Other batters 
Note: G = Games played; AB = At bats; H = Hits; Avg. = Batting average; HR = Home runs; RBI = Runs batted in

Pitching

Starting pitchers 
Note: G = Games pitched; IP = Innings pitched; W = Wins; L = Losses; ERA = Earned run average; SO = Strikeouts

Other pitchers 
Note: G = Games pitched; IP = Innings pitched; W = Wins; L = Losses; ERA = Earned run average; SO = Strikeouts

Relief pitchers 
Note: G = Games pitched; W = Wins; L = Losses; SV = Saves; ERA = Earned run average; SO = Strikeouts

Farm system

References

External links
1974 Houston Astros season at Baseball Reference

Houston Astros seasons
Houston Astros season
Houston Astro